Tall goldenrod is a common name for several species of plants and may refer to:

 Solidago altissima
 Solidago canadensis
 Solidago gigantea